Gaorong Capital is a Beijing-based venture capital firm founded in 2014. The firm focuses on investments related to Technology, Media and Telecommunications (TMT).

Background 
In January 2014, IDG Capital employees Zhen Zhang, Xiang Gao and Bin Yue founded Banyan Capital. The three of them focused on TMT investments during their time at IDG Capital. The firm first fund that had an initial target of US$ 150 million was oversubscribed after only two month with over 40 investors attracted and raised a total of US$ 206 million.

In 2018, the firm changed its name to Gaorong Capital in order to achieve more consistent brand recognition with Chinese entrepreneurs.

The main investors of the firm include entrepreneurs, family offices, fund-of-funds, foundations and other institutional investors such as Tencent, Alibaba and Xiaomi. 

Notable companies that the firm has invested in include Amazfit, Nuro, Pinduoduo and Ucommune

Funds

References

External links
 

Chinese companies established in 2014
Financial services companies established in 2014
Investment management companies of China
Venture capital firms of China